Sean Solme Kim (born September 23, 1979, Daegu) is a South Korean-American executive. He is best known for his role as head of product at TikTok US. Kim was also an executive at Amazon. Additionally, he is president and chief product officer at Kajabi.

Early life and education
Kim was born on September 23, 1979, in Daegu, South Korea. He completed his bachelor's in mathematics from the University of Texas in 2004.

Career
Kim worked as the senior manager for product and marketing at DirecTV from February 2011 to March 2014.

In March of 2014, Kim joined Amazon as the senior marketing manager for Amazon Devices. In March 2016, he joined Amazon Prime as a senior product manager and was later promoted to global head of product for retention.

Kim left Amazon in September of 2019 and joined TikTok US as the head of products.

During the COVID-19 pandemic, Kim has worked on various projects, including live streams with the World Health Organization and other medical personnel, and distributing donation stickers supporting organizations such as Meals on Wheels and the Actors’ Fund.

In February 2022, Kim left TikTok and joined Kajabi as the president and chief product officer, a technology company based in Irvine, California.

References

Living people
1979 births
American technology executives
American people of South Korean descent
People from Daegu
University of Texas at Austin alumni